Zaccheus Marvin "Z." Mason (born January 21, 1991) is an American professional basketball and a former American football player, who last played with Hyères-Toulon Var Basket of France's second division. He previously played for Barangay Ginebra San Miguel on the 2014 PBA Governors' Cup as an import.

He first played football for Christ Presbyterian Academy with a scout grade of 81 before he played basketball as an import for Barangay Ginebra San Miguel, his first professional basketball  experience.

College basketball
In college at the University of Tennessee at Chattanooga, Mason averaged 15.2 points, 9.7 rebounds, and 3.0 blocks during his last year.

Professional career

Barangay Ginebra San Miguel
Barangay Ginebra San Miguel acquired Mason as an import to play for the 2014 PBA Governors' Cup. Coach Jeffrey Cariaso acquired him for defensive purposes. In the tune-up game before the start of the conference, Mason scored 22 points to help the team win against the San Miguel Beermen.

In his debut game on the 2014 PBA Governors' Cup, he tallied 21 points, 15 rebounds, and four assists in the team's win.

In his second game on the 2014 PBA Governors' Cup, the team won again, and Mason finished with 32 points and 19 rebounds against the Meralco Bolts. In his third game, against the Air21 Express, he tallied 22 points, 9 rebounds, and 5 assists; after this win, the team was the only undefeated team remaining.

Hyères-Toulon Var Basket
On August 1, 2014, Mason signed with Hyères-Toulon Var Basket of LNB Pro B in France.

References

External links
 Chattanooga bio

1991 births
Living people
American expatriate basketball people in France
American expatriate basketball people in the Philippines
Barangay Ginebra San Miguel players
Basketball players from Nashville, Tennessee
Centers (basketball)
Chattanooga Mocs men's basketball players
HTV Basket players
Ole Miss Rebels football players
Philippine Basketball Association imports
American men's basketball players
African-American basketball players
21st-century African-American sportspeople